Rayforstia is a genus of spiders in the family Anapidae. It was first described in 2010 by Rix & Harvey. , it contains 12 species.

Species
Rayforstia comprises the following species:
Rayforstia antipoda (Forster, 1959)
Rayforstia insula (Forster, 1959)
Rayforstia lordhowensis Rix & Harvey, 2010
Rayforstia mcfarlanei (Forster, 1959)
Rayforstia plebeia (Forster, 1959)
Rayforstia propinqua (Forster, 1959)
Rayforstia raveni Rix & Harvey, 2010
Rayforstia salmoni (Forster, 1959)
Rayforstia scuta (Forster, 1959)
Rayforstia signata (Forster, 1959)
Rayforstia vulgaris (Forster, 1959)
Rayforstia wisei (Forster, 1964)

References

Anapidae
Araneomorphae genera
Spiders of Australia
Spiders of New Zealand